Alexander Hoad (born April 10, 1984) is a professional Canadian football defensive back who last played for the Helsinki Wolverines of the SAJL in Finland. He was a member of the Canada national football team in 2011. Hoad also played for the Mönchengladbach Mavericks of the German Football League in 2010 and Swarco Raiders Tirol of the AFL in 2009. In 2008 after graduation Hoad signed and played arena football in the AF2 with the Quad City Steamwheelers. He played CIS football for the university of Ottawa Gee-Gees

References

1984 births
Living people
Canadian football defensive backs
German Football League players
Ottawa Gee-Gees football players
Sportspeople from Crawley